The William Westcott House (also known as the R. R. Byers House) is a historic home in Orange Park, Florida. It is located at 443 Stiles Avenue. On July 15, 1998, it was added to the U.S. National Register of Historic Places.

References

External links
 
 Clay County listings at National Register of Historic Places

National Register of Historic Places in Clay County, Florida
Houses on the National Register of Historic Places in Florida
Houses in Clay County, Florida